Sneak magazine was a British weekly magazine for young women. It focused on celebrity gossip, real-life stories and high street fashion and beauty. The magazine was owned by Emap, one of the biggest publishers of magazines in the UK.

It ran from April 2002 with the last edition being published in August 2006.

References

2002 establishments in the United Kingdom
2006 disestablishments in the United Kingdom
Weekly magazines published in the United Kingdom
Defunct magazines published in the United Kingdom
Magazines established in 2002
Magazines disestablished in 2006
Teen magazines